Junior Watson is an American jump blues guitarist and singer.

Career
Watson is a West Coast blues guitarist. He was a founding member of the blues band The Mighty Flyers and, starting in the early 1980s, he performed with the band for a decade. He also performed with Canned Heat throughout the 1990s. Watson has performed as a backing musician in performances and recordings for a number of blues musicians, including Big Mama Thornton, George Smith, Jimmy Rogers, Luther Tucker, Charlie Musselwhite, Mark Hummel, John Németh, Michael "Pink" Arguello, and Kim Wilson.

Discography

As leader
 Long Overdue – 1994 (Black Top 1099)
 Back To Back – 1998 (Crosscut CCD 11059) with Lynwood Slim
 If I Had A Genie – 2002 (Heart & Soul 10799)
 Jumpin' Wit Junior – 2012 (Regal Radio Records 10038)
 Live From Outer Space – 2012 (Bluebeat Music 103) with The Red Wagons
 Nothin' to It But to Do It – 2019 (Little Village Foundation 1033)

Session works (in alphabetical order)
 Kid Andersen – Rock Awhile – 2003 (Blue Soul 2312)
 Bharath & His Rhythm Four – Friday Night Fatty – 2007 (Fatty 2078)
 Bishop / Milite – North South East West – 2004 (Sovereign Records) with JW-Jones, Mark Hummel, and Gary Primich
 Big Al Blake & The Hollywood Fats Band – Mr. Blake's Blues – 1997 (Blue Collar 7108)
 Brenda Burns – A Song Away From You – 1997 (Big Boss)
 Canned Heat – Reheated – 1988 (SPV 858805; Chameleon/Elektra 89022)
 Canned Heat – Burnin [live] – 1991 (SPV 848857)
 Canned Heat – Live in Australia – 1993 (Aim 1003)
 Canned Heat – Internal Combustion – 1994 (Aim 1044)
 Canned Heat – Canned Heat Blues Band – 1997 (Rowyno 5020; Ruf 1040)
 Chicago Flying Saucers – LIVE – 1997
 William Clarke – Can't You Hear Me Calling – 1983 (Watch Dog 1005)
 William Clarke – Tip of the Top – 1987 (Satch 102; Double Trouble [Netherlands] 3016; King Ace 1063)
 William Clarke & Junior Watson – Double Dealin''' [1983 sessions] – 2010 (Bluebeat Music 102)
 Teisco Del Rey – The Many Moods of Teisco Del Rey – 1992 (Upstart 007)
 Johnny Dyer – Johnny Dyer & The L.A. Jukes – 1983 (Murray Brothers, 1004; Blind Pig 5028)
 James Harman – Thank You Baby – 1983 (Enigma 1033)
 James Harman – Extra Napkins – 1988 (Rivera 505; Cannonball 29102)
 James Harman – Mo' Na'kins, Please! – 2000 (Cannonball 29112)
 Shakey Jake Harris – The Key Won't Fit – 1983 (Murray Brothers, 1002)Blues Harp Meltdown Vol 1 – 2000 (Mountain Top 101) with Kim Wilson, Rick Estrin, James Harman,  Mark Hummel, Billy Branch and others
 Mark Hummel – Hard Lovin' 1990s – 1992 (Double Trouble [Netherlands] 3029)
 JW-Jones – Bluelisted – 2008 (NorthernBlues Music 0046)
 Candye Kane – Guitar'd And Feathered – 2007 (Ruf Records 1127)
 Mitch Kashmar Featuring Junior Watson – Nickels & Dimes – 2005 (Delta Groove 103)
 Mitch Kashmar – Wake Up & Worry – 2006 (Delta Groove 109)
 John "Juke" Logan – The Chill – 1993 (Virgin [France] 87834-2; Mocombo Records 55006)
 Lynwood Slim – Lost in America – 1991 (Black Magic [Netherlands] 9017)
 Janiva Magness & Jeff Turmes – It Takes One To Know One – 1997 (Fathead 1001)
 Mark Hummel – Lowdown to Uptown – 1997 (Tone Cool 1169)
 The Mighty Flyers – Radioactive Material – 1981 (Right Hemisphere 6457)
 The Mighty Flyers – File Under Rock – 1984 (Tacoma 7108)
 The Mighty Flyers – From The Start to the Finnish – 1985 (Right Hemisphere 8568)
 The Mighty Flyers – Undercover – 1988 (Special Delivery SPD 1020)
 The Mighty Mojo Prophets – The Mighty Mojo Prophets – 2011 (Rip Cat Records 1102)
 Charlie Musselwhite – In My Time – 1993 (Alligator ALCD 4818)
 Charlie Musselwhite – Rough News – 1997 (Point Blank/Virgin 42856)
 Dan E Bungee – Jamm'in With Junior – 2002 (East Coast Left Coast Sessions)
 John Németh featuring Junior Watson – Come And Get It – 2004
 John Németh – Magic Touch – 2007 (Blind Pig 5109)
 Rod Piazza – Harpburn – 1986 (Murray Brothers, 1008; Black Top 1087)
 Snooky Pryor – In This Mess Up to My Chest – 2000 (Antone's 0028)
 Raoul and The Big Time – Cold Outside – 2004 (Big Time Records BTRCD-002)
 Raoul and The Big Time – You My People – 2009 (Big Time Records BTRCD- 004) 
 Raoul and The Big Time – Hollywood Blvd – 2014 (Big Time Records BTRCD -006) 
 Kid Ramos – West Coast House Party – 2000 (Evidence 26110)
 The Red Wagons – Jumpin' With Friends! – 2012 (independent release/CD Baby) with Sugar Ray Norcia, Lynwood Slim, Mitch Woods, Igor Prado, and Sax Gordon Beadle
 Sonny Rhodes – I Don't Want My Blues Colored Bright – 1976 (Amigo CD 9024)
 Rob Rio – Banking on the Boogie – 1992 (Boss 004)
 Rob Rio – Fine Young Girl – 1994 (Boss 005)
 Rob Rio – Swing Train – 1996 (Boss 006)
 Jimmy Rogers – Feelin' Good – 1984 (Murray Brothers, 1006; Blind Pig 5018)
 Andy Santana & The West Coast Playboys – Swingin' Rockin' Jumpin' & Jivin – 1998
 Gary Smith – Blues For Mr. B – 2001 (Mountain Top)
 George "Harmonica" Smith – Boogie'n With George – 1982 (Murray Brothers, 1001; Blind Pig 5049)
 Bill Stuve – Big Noise – 1990 (Tramp 9906)
 Nick Trill – Juggling The Blues – 1999
 Billy Watson – Blowin' Crow – 2007
 Billy Watson – Lucky 7 – 2009
 Kim Wilson – Tiger Man – 1993 (Antone's 0023)
 Kim Wilson- That's Life – 1994 (Antone's 0034)
 Kim Wilson – My Blues – 1997 (Blue Collar 7107)
 Various artists – The Blues You Just Would Hate To Lose, Volume 1'' [project sampler] – 1996 (Right on Rhythm)

References

External links
Official website

Year of birth missing (living people)
Living people
American blues guitarists
American male guitarists
American blues singers
Jump blues musicians
West Coast blues musicians
Canned Heat members
Place of birth missing (living people)